Monrovia Black Star Football Club is a club based in Monrovia, Liberia. Its home stadium is the Antonette Tubman Stadium. In 2008, the club won the Liberian Premier League (LPL) and Liberian Cup for the first time in its history.

History

 1980 – 4th Division
 1981 – 4th Division
 1982 – 4th Division
 1983 – 3rd Division
 1984 – 3rd Division
 1985 – 2nd Division
 1986 – 2nd Division
 1987 – 2nd Division
 1988 – 1st Division
 1989 – 1st Division
 1990 – 1st Division
 1991 – 1st Division
 1992 – 1st Division
 1993 – Premier League

 1998 – 1st Division
 1999 – Premier League
 2000 – Premier League
 2001 – Premier League
 2002 – Premier League
 2003 – 1st Division
 2004 – 1st Division
 2005 – 1st Division
 2006 – Premier League
 2007 – Premier League
 2008 – Premier League
 2009 – Premier League
 2010/11 – Premier League

Achievements
Liberian Premier League: 1
2008
Liberian Cup: 1
2008

Performance in CAF competitions
CAF Champions League: 1 appearance
2009: Preliminary Round

CAF Confederation Cup: 1 appearance
2008 – Preliminary Round

Players
As of 26 February 2008.

Current squad

References

 
Football clubs in Liberia
Sport in Monrovia
Association football clubs established in 1980
1980 establishments in Liberia